The Darker Shades of White is the debut full-length studio album released by the Christian metal band Corpus Christi.  The album was released by Victory Records on February 17, 2009 to generally positive reviews.

Track listing

Personnel 
Will Henry - Harsh Vocals
Jarrod Christman - Rhythm Guitar, Clean vocals
Jon Pauly - Guitar
Phil Smith - Bass guitar
Justin Evans - Drums

Media Recognition 
Corpus Christi has been featured numerous times on TVU and RadioU's metal show RadioU Hardcore for their music video and hit song, "Fight for Your King."

References

External links 
Corpus Christi Official Myspace
Corpus Christi on Victory Records

2009 debut albums
Corpus Christi (band) albums
Victory Records albums